Nova Civitas was a Flemish think tank based on the principles of classic liberalism in combination with Anglo-Saxon conservatism. Nova Civitas claimed at its founding to be completely independent, although it was recognized and supported by the Flemish Liberal Party (VLD). The Founding Chairman of Nova Civitas, Boudewijn Bouckaert, was a long-time board member of the VLD.

According to their website, the basic principles of Nova Civitas were : 

Nova Civitas was founded in 1992, in the tradition of the Belgian 1980s, Ludwig Von Mises Institute as a new political club to support the rebirth of a strong liberal movement in Belgium dominated by the VLD in Flanders and the Liberal Reformist Party in Wallonia. Nova Civitas was headquartered in Ghent. In 2004, a new regional committee was created in Antwerp, followed in 2006 by one in Brussels.

Nova Civitas opposed the "socialist welfare state" and advocated further transfers of competences from the federal to the regional levels. Nova Civitas also proposed a regrouping of political forces into what would have become a de facto two-party system, with a big centre-right/right-wing political party alliance in Flanders, including VLD, Christen-Democratisch en Vlaams, New Flemish Alliance and Vlaams Belang. At the time, this stirred controversy and several Nova Civitas members were rebuked by the VLD. Senators Hugo Coveliers and Jean-Marie Dedecker were even forced to leave the party in the ensuing turmoil.

In 2007, Nova Civitas member Jean-Marie Dedecker started his own political party, the eponymous List Dedecker (now: Libertarian, Direct, Democratic) and established a new think tank, Cassandra, to serve as the ideological laboratory for his party.

From 2003 to 2009, Nova Civitas granted an annual award: Liberty Prize.

In 2009, both Cassandra and Nova Civitas fell victim of internal disputes, and decided to disband themselves. A new classical liberal think tank, Libera!, replaced Nova Civitas. Libera! grants the annual Prize for Liberty.

Prize for Liberty 
From 2003 tot 2009, Nova Civitas granted the annual Prize for Liberty. Each laureate was expected to provide a Gustave de Molinari-lecture. Since the 2009, the Liberty Prize was continued by Libera!.
 2003: Luuk van Middelaar, liberal philosopher and publicist
 2004: Ayaan Hirsi Ali, Dutch parliament member for the VVD
 2005: Matthias Storme, professor and liberal theorist
 2006: Alain Destexhe, Belgian senator for MR
 2007: Derk Jan Eppink, liberal-conservative journalist
 2008: Urbanus, comedian and entertainer
 2009: Mark Grammens, conservative journalist
Awards by Libera!:
 2010: Frits Bolkestein, Dutch/European politician
 2011: Theodore Dalrymple, conservative theorist
 2012: Johan Van Overtveldt, chief editor of Trends
 2013: Frank van Dun, law philosopher
 2014: Peter De Keyzer, chief economist BNP Paribas Fortis
 2015: Jean-Marie Dedecker, founder LDD
 2016: Fernand Huts, chairman Katoen Natie
 2017: Hans Bourlon and Gert Verhulst, founders of Studio 100
 2018: Thierry Baudet, founder of Forum voor Democratie
 2019: Marc De Vos, founder of the Itinera Institute
 2020: De Strangers, band from Antwerp
 2021: Lieven Annemans, health economist
 2022: Boudewijn Bouckaert, law and economics professor, former President of Libera!

See also
 Liberaal Vlaams Verbond
 Liberales

References

External links
 

1992 establishments in Belgium
Political and economic think tanks based in the European Union
Libertarianism in Belgium
Libertarian think tanks
Think tanks established in 1992
Think tanks based in Belgium